Cochlespiridae is a taxonomic family of predatory sea snails, marine gastropod mollusks in the superfamily Conoidea.

This family is not well differentiated morphologically, and there is poor congruence between the molecular and shell characters. Its limits are uncertain. Even the contents of most of the genera are in need of revision.

The family is composed of some genera that used to belong to the subfamily Cochlespirinae, in the family Turridae. This family has no subfamilies.

General characteristics
This family consists of moderately sized shells, usually between 20 and 30 mm, but in Nihonia maxima the length of shell can reach 128 mm. The shell of Aforia magnifica even reaches 150 mm. The shell is turriculated and fusiform with a long, sharp spire. Axial sculpture is absent or feebly developed. The aperture is ovate. The columellar margin is smoot. The outer lip has a narrow profound anal sinus on the subsutural ramp. The open siphonal canal is long, narrow, and straight. The operculum has a terminal nucleus.

The foot of the animal is truncated anteriorly, obtuse posteriorly. The eyes are located externally near the base of cylindrical tentacles. The radula formula is 1-0-R-0-1  The duplex radular teeth are nonhypodermic.

Genera
  Abyssaforia Sysoev & Kantor, 1987 : type species: Aforia abyssalis Sysoev & Kantor, 1987
 Aforia Dall, 1889
 Ancistrosyrinx Dall, 1881
 Apiotoma Cossmann, 1889
 Clavosurcula Schepman, 1913
 Cochlespira Conrad, 1865
 Comispira Kantor, Fedosov & Puillandre, 2018 
 Dallaforia Sysoev & Kantor, 1987
 Nihonia McNeil, 1961
 † Pseudocochlespira Schnetler, 2001 
 Sibogasyrinx Powell, 1969
Genera brought into synonymy
 Coronasyrinx Powell, 1944: synonym of Cochlespira Conrad, 1865
 Danilacarina Bozzetti, 1997: synonym of Aforia Dall, 1889
 Irenosyrinx Dall, 1908: synonym of Aforia Dall, 1889
 Pagodasyrinx Shuto, 1969: synonym of Cochlespira Conrad, 1865
  Steiraxis Dall, 1896: synonym of Aforia Dall, 1889
 Tahusyrinx Powell, 1942 : synonym of Cochlespira Conrad, 1865

References

 Sysoev, A. V., and Yu I. Kantor. "Deep-sea gastropods of the genus Aforia (Turridae) of the Pacific species composition, systematics, and functional morphology of the digestive system." The Veliger 30.2 (1987): 105-121.

External links
 Worldwide Mollusk Species Data Base: family Cochlespiridae

 
Conoidea